The mountain slug snake (Pareas margaritophorus), also known as the white-spotted slug snake, is a small, harmless species of snake that is rather common in South, South-East, and East Asia, and feeds on small invertebrates.

Characteristics
Mountain slug snakes are forest-dwellers that are about small to medium-sized. They have fangs that are located on their lower jaw in which they can use to remove the snail from their shells to eat. They have blunt heads that are wider than their actual body width. It averages about 47 cm in length and can be spotted by its collar that can be yellow or orange with a grey or brown body. It also has black scales with a pale underside with dark spots.

Habits
The mountain slug snake is a nocturnal species that is active on the forest floor or on shallow vegetation that are usually found in lowland or lower mountain forests that are at the elevation of 1500 meters.

Diet
Mountain slug snakes feed on the following invertebrates:
snails
slugs
earthworms

Distribution
It is found in NE India, Myanmar, Thailand, Peninsular Malaysia, Laos, Cambodia, Vietnam, Hong Kong, and China.

References

 Jan, Giorgio. 1866. in: Bocourt, F. Notes sur les reptiles, les batraciens et les poissons recueilles pendant un voyage dans le Royaume de Siam. Nouv. Arch. Mus. Hist. Nat. Paris. 2(2):4-20.
 Theobald, William. 1868. Catalogue of the reptiles of British Burma, embracing the provinces of Pegu, Martaban, and Tenasserim; with descriptions of new or little-known species. Jour. Linnean Soc., London, Zool., 10: 4-67.

External references
 photo

Pareas
Reptiles of Bangladesh
Reptiles of Cambodia
Snakes of China
Reptiles of Hong Kong
Reptiles of India
Reptiles of Laos
Snakes of Malaysia
Snakes of Myanmar
Snakes of Thailand
Snakes of Vietnam
Reptiles described in 1868
Taxa named by Giorgio Jan
Reptiles of the Malay Peninsula